22457 / 58 Hazur Sahib Nanded Una Himachal Express was a Superfast train belonging to Indian Railways Northern Railway zone that ran between  and  in India. However, the train has now been discontinued or renumbered/renamed as Hazur Sahib Nanded- Amb Andaura Express (22709 / 10).

Service 
It operated as train number 22457 from Hazur Sahib Nanded to Una Himachal and as train number 22458 in the reverse direction, serving the states of Maharashtra, Madhya Pradesh, Uttar Pradesh, Delhi, Haryana, Punjab & Himachal Pradesh.

Coaches

The 22457 / 58 Hazur Sahib Nanded–Una Himachal  Express had one AC 2-Tier, two AC 3-tier, three sleeper class, six general unreserved & two SLR (seating with luggage rake) coaches . It didn't carry a pantry car.

As with most train services in India, coach composition may be amended at the discretion of Indian Railways depending on demand.

Routeing

Traction

References

External links
 22457 Hazur Sahib Nanded–Una Himachal Express at India Rail Info
 22458 Una Himachal–Hazur Sahib Nanded Express at India Rail Info

Transport in Nanded
Transport in Una, Himachal Pradesh
Express trains in India
Rail transport in Maharashtra
Rail transport in Madhya Pradesh
Rail transport in Uttar Pradesh
Rail transport in Delhi
Rail transport in Haryana
Rail transport in Punjab, India
Rail transport in Himachal Pradesh